Sagar Division is an administrative geographical unit of Madhya Pradesh state of India. Sagar is the administrative headquarters of the division. As of 2005, the division consists of districts of Sagar, Chhatarpur, Damoh, Panna, Tikamgarh. Niwari

Sagar division consists of that part of Bundelkhand that lies in Madhya Pradesh

References

www.mponline.gov.in

Divisions of Madhya Pradesh